The Embassy of Poland in Kyiv is the diplomatic mission of the Republic of Poland in Ukraine.

History 
Following the Declaration of Independence of Ukraine on 24 August 1991, Poland recognized Ukraine on 2 December 1991. Diplomatic relations between the two countries was established on 4 January 1992.

List of ambassadors
 Stanislaw Wankowicz (1918)
 Bogdan Kutyłowski (1919-1921)
 John Francis Pulaski (1921)
 Francis Charwat (1921-1923)
 Marcel Szarota (1923-1924)
 Jerzy Kozakiewicz (1992-1997)
 Jerzy Bahr (1997-2001)
 Marek Ziółkowski (2001-2005)
 Jacek Kluczkowski (2005-2010)
 Henryk Litwin (2011-2016)
 Jan Piekło (2016-2019)
 Bartosz Cichocki (2019-present)

See also 
 Poland-Ukraine relations
 Foreign relations of Poland
 Foreign relations of Ukraine
 Embassy of Ukraine, Warsaw
 Diplomatic missions in Ukraine
 Diplomatic missions of Poland

References

External links 
 Embassy of Poland in Kyiv
 Ministry of Foreign Affairs of Poland
 Ministry of Foreign Affairs of Ukraine

Poland
Kyiv
Poland–Ukraine relations